The Executive Council of the Eastern Cape is the cabinet of the executive branch of the provincial government in the South African province of the Eastern Cape. The Members of the Executive Council (MECs) are appointed from among the members of the Eastern Cape Provincial Legislature by the Premier of the Eastern Cape, an office held since the 2019 general election by Oscar Mabuyane of the African National Congress (ANC).

Kiviet premiership: 2009–2014 
Following his election as Premier in the 2009 general election, Noxolo Kiviet announced his Executive Council in May 2009. On 27 November 2010, he announced a major cabinet reshuffle, which included restructuring more than half of the ten portfolios in the Executive Council.

Masualle premiership: 2014–2019 
Phumulo Masualle was elected Premier in the 2014 general election and he announced his new Executive Council on 23 May 2014. Near the end of his term, on 10 May 2018, Masualle announced a major reshuffle, effective from the day before; four MECs – Mlibo Qoboshiyane, Thandiswa Marawu, Sakhumzi Somyo and Nancy Sihlwayi – were sacked, and others changed portfolios. In a minor reshuffle in November that year, Babalo Madikizela was appointed to the Executive Council to take over the portfolio of Human Settlements MEC Mlungisi Mvoko, who in turn was appointed to fill the vacancy left by the death of Education MEC Mandla Makupula in October.

Mabuyane premiership: 2019–present 
On 28 May 2019, following the 2019 general election, newly elected Premier Oscar Mabuyane announced his new Executive Council; he retained four MECs from the previous administration, although three of those four had not joined until 2018. On 18 February 2021, Mabuyane announced that he had fired Sindiswa Gomba as Health MEC amid allegations that she had been involved in procurement irregularities. Gomba's replacement was appointed in a cabinet reshuffle affecting four portfolios, announced by Mabuyane in early March.

In May 2022, shortly after losing his bid to oust Mabuyane as ANC Provincial Chairperson at a party conference, Public Works MEC Babalo Madikizela announced his intention to resign from government. He officially resigned in late July. His departure occasioned a cabinet reshuffle, announced on 16 August, in which Mabuyane appointed three new MECs and moved three others to different portfolios. The two MECs fired in the reshuffle – Fezeka Nkomonye and Weziwe Tikana-Gxothiwe – were viewed as having supported Madikizela's campaign at the ANC conference.

See also 

 Template:Eastern Cape Executive Council
 Government of South Africa
 Constitution of South Africa
 Cape province

References 

Government of the Eastern Cape